The Women's elimination race was held on 19 October 2016.

Results

References

Women's elimination race
European Track Championships – Women's elimination race